There have been two baronetcies created for persons with the surname Ley, one in the Baronetage of England and one in the Baronetage of the United Kingdom.

The Ley Baronetcy, of Westbury in the County of Wiltshire, was created in the Baronetage of England on 20 July 1619. For more information on this creation, see the Earl of Marlborough.

The Ley Baronetcy, of Epperstone Manor in the parish of Epperstone in the County of Nottingham, was created in the Baronetage of the United Kingdom on 27 December 1905 for the industrialist and promoter of sports Francis Ley. He was the founder of Ley's Malleable Castings Vulcan Ironworks in Derby and also served as high sheriff of Nottinghamshire in 1905. The family surname is pronounced "Lee".

Ley baronets, of Westbury (1619)
see the Earl of Marlborough

Ley baronets, of Epperstone Manor (1905)
Sir Francis Ley, 1st Baronet (1846–1916)
Sir Henry Gordon Ley, 2nd Baronet (1874–1944)
Sir Gerald Gordon Ley, 3rd Baronet (1902–1980)
Sir Francis Douglas Ley, 4th Baronet (1907–1995)
Sir Ian Francis Ley, 5th Baronet (1934–2017)
Sir Christopher Ian Ley, 6th Baronet (born 1962)

Notes

References 
Kidd, Charles & Williamson, David (editors). Debrett's Peerage and Baronetage (1990 edition). New York: St Martin's Press, 1990, 

Baronetcies in the Baronetage of the United Kingdom
Extinct baronetcies in the Baronetage of England